The XI Bolivarian Games (Spanish: Juegos Bolivarianos) were a multi-sport event held between January 14–25, 1989, in Maracaibo, Venezuela. The Games were organized by the Bolivarian Sports Organization (ODEBO).

The opening ceremony took place on January 14, 1989, at the Estadio Olímpico Pachencho Romero in Maracaibo, Venezuela.  The Games were officially opened by Venezuelan president Jaime Lusinchi.  Torch lighter was 76-year-old former tennis player and gold medalist Carlos Leal.

A detailed history of the early editions of the Bolivarian Games between 1938 and 1989 was published in a book written (in Spanish) by José Gamarra Zorrilla, former president of the Bolivian Olympic Committee, and first president (1976–1982) of ODESUR.  Gold medal winners from Ecuador were published by the Comité Olímpico Ecuatoriano.

Participation 
About 1286 athletes from 6 countries were reported to participate:

Sports 
The following 20 sports (+ 2 exhibition events) were explicitly mentioned:

 Aquatic sports
  Diving
  Swimming
  Synchronized swimming
  Athletics
  Baseball
  Basketball
  Bowling
  Boxing
  Caballos amaestrados (Dressage)†
 Cycling
  Road cycling
  Track cycling
  Equestrian
  Fencing
  Gymnastics (artistic)
  Judo
  Karate†
  Sailing 
  Shooting
  Softball
  Table tennis
  Taekwondo
  Tennis
  Volleyball
  Weightlifting
  Wrestling

†: Exhibition event.

Medal count 
The medal count for these Games is tabulated below.  A slightly different number of medals was published elsewhere.  This table is sorted by the number of gold medals earned by each country.  The number of silver medals is taken into consideration next, and then the number of bronze medals.

References 

Bolivarian Games
B
B
Bolivarian Games
B
Multi-sport events in Venezuela
January 1989 sports events in South America
Sports competitions in Maracaibo
20th century in Maracaibo